Nanlang railway station is an elevated station of Guangzhou–Zhuhai intercity railway.

The station is located near Yakou Village, Nanlang Town, Zhongshan, Guangdong, China, a famous seafood village in Zhongshan. It started operations on 7 January 2011.

References

Railway stations in Guangdong
Zhongshan
Railway stations in China opened in 2011